Diversions is a 1987 album (LP Vinyl) released by the California State University, Los Angeles Jazz Ensemble, it featured the Charles Richard Suite for Jazz Orchestra which was premiered by Dave Edwards earlier that year.  This group proved to be one of the finest college jazz orchestras of that era with having placed in the finals of the Pacific Coast Collegiate Jazz Festival.  The jazz band had numerous student musicians that have made a name for themselves as professionals to include Sharon Hirata, Luis Bonilla, Jack Cooper, Charlie Richard, Eric "Bobo" Correa, Vince Dublino, Alan Parr, and José Arellano.

Background 

In 1984 and 1985 the California State University, Los Angeles Music Department and CSULA Associated Students decided to fund LP recordings of the jazz ensemble to better serve as a teaching tool for student music, jazz groups.   Diversions is the third of six albums to come from CSULA during the 1980s featuring the award winning CSULA #1 Jazz Ensemble.     The LP contains tracks from the #1 CSULA Jazz Ensemble to include compositions of four students and from the director (professor David Caffey).   The group was fortunate enough to have the assistance or both George Stone on piano for the recording and world-class saxophonist Dave Edwards who premiered Charlie Richard's work earlier that academic year.      
 
The qualities of the LP that set it apart from numerous university jazz records of that era is the fact it was entirely written and composed by the students and faculty of CSULA at such a high level; also this being the third LP in a row CSULA had done this. 
There has been a consistent tradition of musicians coming from the CSULA program who have worked with major musical acts, on major studio and movie projects, and hold positions in higher education in music.   The roster on this album is self-evident as to the diversity and level of student musicians CSULA developed at that time and has for many years dating far back to musicians (graduates) such as Lennie Niehaus and Gabe Baltazar.

Track listing

Recording Sessions 
 Recorded: May 16, 17, and 22, 1987, Sage and Sound Recording, Hollywood, California
 Mixing: June 10, 15, 29, 1987, Sage and Sound Recording, Hollywood, California

Personnel

Musicians 
Conductor: David Caffey
Saxes and woodwinds: Charlie Richard, Sharon Hirata, Jack Cooper,  Scott Ackerman, Randall Willis
Trumpets and flugelhorns: Simon Austin, Alan Parr, Monty Montgomery, Chris Mauger, Jim Bynum
Trombones: Gary Smith, Luis Bonilla, Jose Arellano, Rick Acosta
Tuba: Dr. John Swain
Guitar: John Taylor
Piano: George Stone, Robert Gutierrez
Vibraphone and marimba: Cory Estrada
Bass: Mark Tavarez
Drums: Vince Dublino
Percussion: Eric "Bobo" Correa

Production 
Recording engineers: Jim Mooney, Bob Kinsey, and Jerry Wood
Mixing engineers: Jim Mooney and David Caffey
Mastering: K Disc
Cover art: Randy Piland

References

External links
Diversions at Allmusic Guide
 

1987 albums
California State University, Los Angeles Jazz Ensemble albums